New College Lanarkshire Coatbridge Campus, previously the independent Coatbridge College was Scotland’s oldest further education college, founded in 1865. The College has over 250 staff members and approximately 7,000 students.  The College provides further education to the people of North Lanarkshire, in particular those who live in Coatbridge and Airdrie.
  
The 1970s saw Coatbridge College move away from traditional heavy industries and it changed its focus to commerce. In 1984 the College was extended to create computing suites, hairdressing and beauty salons, a refectory area, sports facilities and a large Theatre, which was later named the Ian Bannen Theatre.

In 2013 there was a proposal to merge Coatbridge College with other further education colleges in North Lanarkshire, but Coatbridge pulled out. However, the merger into New College Lanarkshire (with the former Motherwell College and Cumbernauld College) took place the following year.

Campuses 

The College is currently split over three Campuses. The Kildonan Street Campus is the College’s main campus offering eight out of ten subject areas. The Greenhills Campus is home to the Automotive and Transport Department, with The School of Dental Studies based at the Duart House Campus at Strathclyde Business Park.

The Kildonan campus has a number of facilities for the use of students, including a library, 2 internet cafes, a student lounge and two cafes.

Curriculum 

The College currently offers study within 10 Curriculum subject areas including:

 Automotive and Transport
 Beauty, Spa and Holistic Therapies
 Business and Management
 Computing and Creative Technologies
 The School of Dental Studies
 Early Education and Childcare
 Hairdressing and Make-up Artistry
 Health and Social Care
 Performing Arts
 Science

Estate Redevelopment 

June 2009 saw the College undergo a redevelopment of its Kildonan Street Campus. Phase 1 included a £22.5 million refurbishment of the College’s south building to improve facilities and provide full disabled access funded by the Scottish Funding Council.  The project started as planned in June 2009 and was completed on schedule in April 2011.

References 

Coatbridge
Education in North Lanarkshire
Further education colleges in Scotland
Educational institutions established in 1865
1865 establishments in Scotland
Educational institutions disestablished in 2014
2014 disestablishments in Scotland